Przyłubie may refer to the following places:
Przyłubie, Greater Poland Voivodeship (west-central Poland)
Przyłubie, Kuyavian-Pomeranian Voivodeship (north-central Poland)
Przyłubie, Masovian Voivodeship (east-central Poland)